Scoparia nephelitis is a moth in the family Crambidae. It was described by Edward Meyrick in 1887. It is found in Australia, where it has been recorded from New South Wales.

It is a member of the grass moth genus, which has species on every continent except Antarctica.

References

Moths described in 1887
Scorparia